Keep the Customer Satisfied is a 1970 live album by the Buddy Rich Big Band, recorded at the Tropicana Resort & Casino in Las Vegas.

Track listing 
LP side A
"Keep the Customer Satisfied" (Paul Simon) – 6:40
"Long Day's Journey" (Don Piestrup) – 4:42
Midnight Cowboy Medley: "He Quit Me Man"/"Everybody's Talkin'"/"Tears and Joys" Jeffrey Comanor) – 11:12
LP side B
"Celebration" (Don Piestrup) – 3:35
"Groovin' Hard" (Don Menza) – 5:25
"The Juicer Is Wild" (Neil, Roger Neuman) – 4:32
"Winning the West" (Bill Holman) – 7:30
Bonus tracks on CD re-issues:
"Body and Soul" (Frank Eyton, Johnny Green, Edward Heyman, Robert Sour) – 4:54
"Happy Time" (Mike Hughes) – 3:57
"The Nitty Gritty" (Lincoln Chase) – 4:07
"Straight and Narrow" (Don Piestrup) – 4:17
"Groovin' Hard" (Don Menza) – 5:54
"Cornerstone" (Ted Pease) – 4:45

Personnel 
The Buddy Rich big band
 Buddy Rich - drums
Bob Suchoski - baritone saxophone
Rick Laird - double bass
Richie Cole - flute, alto saxophone
Jimmy Mosher - alto saxophone
Pat LaBarbera - tenor saxophone
Don Englert - flute, soprano saxophone, tenor saxophone
Tony Lada - secord trombone
Rick Stepton - first trombone
John Madrid - trumpet
Joe Giorgiani
Mike Price - lead trumpet
George Zonce - second trumpet
Meredith "Mick" McClain - piano
Roger Neuman - arranger
Bill Holman - arranger
Michael Hughes 
Don Menza
Ted Pease
Don Piestrup - arranger
Joe Sample
Production
Ron Wolin - cover design
Reice Hamel - engineer
Paul Wertheimer - liner notes
Joel Moss - mixing
Ron Waller - photography
Richard Bock - producer
Bob Belden - reissue producer, mixing
Dean Pratt - reissue producer

References 

Liberty / Pacific Jazz LST 11006
Liberty LBS 83334
Blue Note 23999

Buddy Rich live albums
1970 live albums
Albums recorded at the Tropicana Las Vegas
Pacific Jazz Records live albums
Liberty Records live albums
Blue Note Records live albums